Nowhere to Go may refer to:

Films
 Nowhere to Go (1958 film), a 1958 British film directed by Basil Dearden and Seth Holt
 Nowhere to Go (1998 film), a 1998 American film starring John Shea

Literature
 "Nowhere to Go: The Tragic Odyssey of the Homeless Mentally Ill", a 1988 book by E. Fuller Torrey

Music
 Nowhere to Go, a 2004 album by Takayoshi Ohmura
 "Nowhere to Go" (Hayden James song), a 2019 single by Hayden James
 "Nowhere to Go", a song by Agnostic Front from their 1999 album Riot, Riot, Upstart
 "Nowhere to Go", a song by Annihilator from their 2010 album Annihilator
 "Nowhere to Go", a song by Backstreet Boys from Unbreakable
 "Nowhere to Go", an unreleased George Harrison song
 "Nowhere to Go", a song by Jan Hammer from the album Hammer
 "Nowhere to Go", a song by Melissa Etheridge from her 1995 album Your Little Secret
 "Nowhere to Go", a song by The Miracles from their 1973 album Renaissance
 "Nowhere to Go", a song by Mushroomhead from their 2003 album XIII
 "Nowhere to Go", a song by Nite Jewel from The Music of Grand Theft Auto V
 "Nowhere to Go", a song by Soul Asylum from their 1986 album Time's Incinerator
 "Nowhere2go", a 2018 song by Earl Sweatshirt
 "Stuck in Paris (Nowhere to Go)", a song by After the Fire from their 2005 album Der Kommissar - The CBS Recordings
 "Working Man (Nowhere to Go)", a 1988 song by the Nitty Gritty Dirt Band